Greiffenhagen is a surname. Notable people with the surname include:
Maurice Greiffenhagen (1862–1931), British painter
Wilhelm Greiffenhagen (1821–1890), Baltic German journalist and politician

See also
Greifenhagen, village in Saxony-Anhalt, Germany
Greifenhagen, German name for Gryfino, town in West Pomerania province, Poland